Constantin Henriquez was a Haitian-born French rugby union footballer. He played as number eight, wing and centre.

Henriquez was the first known black athlete to compete in the Olympic Games, and the first to become an Olympic gold medallist, as he was a member of the French squad that won the Olympic title at the first Rugby Olympic Tournament.

He played at Olympique de Paris and Stade Français. He won as a Stade Français player the titles of French Champion, in 1897, 1898 and 1901.

He introduced football in his country of Haiti in 1904, and scored the first goal in Haiti during a competition. He co-founded with his brother Alphonse the Union Sportive Haïtienne. By 1950 he was a Senator.

References

External links

Year of birth missing
Year of death missing
Olympic rugby union players of France
French rugby union players
Haitian rugby union players
Haitian emigrants to France
Olympic gold medalists for France
Rugby union players at the 1900 Summer Olympics
Members of the Senate (Haiti)
Black French sportspeople
Place of birth missing
Place of death missing